Lillian Maefai is a member of the Parliament of the Solomon Islands. She was only the fifth woman ever to be elected to that parliament.

Early life
Lillian "Lilly" Maefai was born on the island of Malaita, the most populous island in the Solomon Islands. She graduated with secretarial qualifications from the Honiara Solomon Islands College of Higher Education and then worked for more than a decade at the Solomon Star newspaper, where her husband also worked. The couple than left the paper to start a small printing company.

Political life
Maefai's husband, Charles Maefai, was elected to the parliament for the East Makira constituency on Makira island in the elections of April 2019. He died three months later. Lillian Maefai was asked by his constituents to consider running for parliament in the by-election. Initially she was hesitant because she felt that, as a woman from Malaita, she would not be supported in Makira. However, she was eventually persuaded and was easily elected, receiving close to half the votes in a field of nine candidates. Taking her Oath of Allegiance on 18 December 2019, she became the third woman in the 50-member 2019-2023 parliament, joining Freda Soria Comua and Lanelle Tanangada. A fourth woman, Ethel Lency Vokia, was subsequently elected in 2020.

Although elected as an independent candidate, Maefai announced that she had joined the Ownership, Unity and Responsibility Party ("Our" Party), led by the prime minister, Manasseh Sogavare.

References

Solomon Islands women in politics
Solomon Islands people
Year of birth missing (living people)
Living people
Members of the National Parliament of the Solomon Islands
21st-century politicians
21st-century women politicians
People from Malaita Province
Ownership, Unity and Responsibility Party politicians